Southern Point is an unincorporated community in Scioto Township, Pickaway County, in the U.S. state of Ohio. The area is located at the border of Pickaway and Franklin Counties on Ohio State Route 104. As of 2019, there were more than 500 houses and freestanding condominiums in the community.

History
In 2001, Dominion Homes began building a housing development in an unincorporated area of Scioto Township, Pickaway County, Ohio. The development would consist of two parts, a traditional housing development on the southern end and the northern end would be freestanding condominiums. Each area would be governed by a homeowner association and would be under the jurisdiction of Scioto Township.

The area is served by the Orient post office.

The area's public school district is the Teays Valley Local School District. Students attend South Bloomfield Elementary (K-5) in South Bloomfield, West Middle School (6-8) in Commercial Point, and Teays Valley High School (9-12) in Ashville.

Notable residents 
 Rhyan Goodman, a two-time National Officer for Business Professionals of America, and two-time Gold President's Volunteer Service Award recipient
 Jacob Reed, a two-time FedEx Package Handler of the Month and distant family member of former Ashville resident John Holmes
 Ralph Wolfe, Scioto Township trustee since 2018

References 

Unincorporated communities in Pickaway County, Ohio
Unincorporated communities in Ohio